Lynne Rienner Publishers is an independent scholarly and textbook publishing firm based in Boulder, Colorado. It was founded in 1984 and remains one of the few independent publishers in the United States.

It publishes primarily in the fields of international studies and comparative world politics, but also covers U.S. politics, sociology, Black politics, criminology, and the translation of relevant works into English. Some of its translations include books by Tawfiq al-Hakim, Ghassan Kanafani, Naguib Mahfouz, Derek Walcott, and others.

Its publishing program includes the FirstForumPress, a specialized scholarly research forum that focuses on important work that might be overlooked due to market constraints, and the Kumarian Press, which focuses on poverty, underdevelopment, war, human rights abuses, and nonprofit managemen).

Further reading

References

External links
Official website

Book publishing companies based in Colorado
Companies based in Boulder, Colorado
Publishing companies established in 1984